BAPCo, Business Applications Performance Corporation, is a non-profit consortium (founded in 1991) with a charter to develop and distribute a set of objective performance benchmarks for personal computers based on popular software applications and operating systems.

BAPCo's current membership includes Acer, ARCIntuition, ASUS, Compal, Dell, Dynabook, Hewlett-Packard, Hitachi, Intel, Inventec, LC Future Center, Lenovo, Pegatron, Quanta Computer, Samsung, Western Digital, Wistron, and others.

Products 
Benchmarks from BAPCo include:

 APPmark® 2018
 MobileMark® 2018
 SYSmark® 2018
 SYSmark 25
CrossMark

Controversy 
BAPco has suffered criticism for bias in its benchmarking products. It was found in 2002 that Intel was the sole contributor to a series of CPU tests, tests which heavily favoured their own CPU's vs competitors, where the tests of the year before performed significantly better on non-Intel parts. Intel was investigated by the FTC, and eventually fined for this action, among other anti-competitive measures.

See also
Standard Performance Evaluation Corporation
Benchmark (computing)
Futuremark

References

External links
BAPCo.com
BAPCo - Results Dashboard

Companies based in Missouri
Technology consortia
Computer performance
Evaluation of computers